Panhu (hanzi: 盤瓠; pinyin Pánhù; IPA: /pʰan³⁵-xu⁵¹/) is an important figure in Chinese and Yao mythologies. The Panhu mythological complex includes myths in Chinese and also other languages. This myth has a long history of being transmitted by Han Chinese and several of the other ethnic groups of the fifty-six officially recognized by the current administration of China, both orally and in literature. (Yang 2005:4) The Panhu myth is an important origin myth for various ethnic groups.

Basic myth
The basic Panhu myth is about a dragon-dog who transformed into a man and married a princess. In the myth, there was an old woman in an ancient Chinese king's palace who had ear pain for many years. A royal physician plucked out a small, golden worm from her ear, and placed it inside of a gourd covered with a plate. This is the origin of Panhu's name, which literally means "plate gourd". The worm then turned into a dog, Panhu, who in some versions had five colored fur. The king offered to marry his daughter to anybody that would present him with the head of his enemy. This was accomplished by Panhu. Accounts vary, but eventually Panhu and the princess had six sons and six daughters who became the famous 12 clans of Chinese mythology.

Variants
There are also variant versions. In some variants, the dragon-dog became transformed into a human, except for his head. (Christie 1968: 121-122) This is sometimes attributed to the princess worrying that he was starving inside the golden vessel he was placed inside of for seven days and seven nights to transform into a human, which resulted in the process being incomplete.

Myth versus history
In the study of historical Chinese culture, many of the stories that have been told regarding characters and events which have been written or told of the distant past have a double tradition: one which tradition which presents a more historicized version and one which presents a more mythological version. (Yang 2005:12-13) This is also true in many of the accounts related to Panhu.

Religion
Many of the myths regarding agriculture in China are related to popular religion and ritual. In modern times, Panhu has been worshiped by the She people and Yao people as "King Pan". (Yang 2005: 52-53).

See also
Chinese folklore

Works cited
Christie, Anthony (1968). Chinese Mythology. Feltham: Hamlyn Publishing. .
Yang, Lihui, et al. (2005). Handbook of Chinese Mythology. New York: Oxford University Press.

References

Further reading
 Fraser, Lucy (2018). "Dogs, Gods, and Monsters: The Animal–Human Connection in Bakin’s Hakkenden, Folktales and Legends, and Two Contemporary Retellings". In: Japanese Studies, 38:1, pp. 103–123. DOI: 10.1080/10371397.2018.1448972

Chinese gods
Chinese legendary creatures
Mythological hybrids
Shapeshifting
She people
Yao people
Classic of Mountains and Seas